This page describes the qualifying procedure for the 1984 UEFA European Under-16 Football Championship. 27 teams were divided into 8 groups of two, three and four teams each. The eight winners advanced to the quarterfinals, consisting in two-legged rounds. The four winners of the quarterfinals advanced to the final tournament.

Group stage

Group 1

Group 2

Group 3

Group 4

Group 5

Group 6

Group 7

Group 8

Quarterfinals

First leg

Second leg

Yugoslavia won 2–1 on aggregate.

England won 5–1 on aggregate.

Soviet Union won 3–1 on aggregate.

West Germany won 6–2 on aggregate.

References and notes

External links
RSSSF.com
UEFA.com

Qualifying
UEFA European Under-17 Championship qualification